Justin Hoogma (born 11 June 1998) is a Dutch professional footballer who plays as a centre-back for Heracles Almelo.

Career
Hoogma had his breakthrough in the 2016–2017 season, becoming the youngest player ever to not have missed a single minute in a full Eredivisie season, playing all 34 matches for Heracles Almelo.

On 13 June 2017, 1899 Hoffenheim announced the transfer of the young prospect on a four-year contract, for an undisclosed fee.

In January 2019, Hoogma joined 2. Bundesliga side FC St. Pauli on loan for the second half of the 2018–19 season.

On 15 July 2021, TSG Hoffenheim announced that Hoogma was being loaned to newly promoted Bundesliga side SpVgg Greuther Fürth on a season-long loan.

On 24 January 2022, Hoogma returned to his former club Heracles Almelo. He signed a contract until 2026 and will wear number 21.

Personal life
His father is former Dutch footballer Nico-Jan Hoogma.

Career statistics

References

External links
 
 Voetbal International profile 

1998 births
Footballers from Enschede
Living people
Association football defenders
Dutch footballers
Eredivisie players
Bundesliga players
2. Bundesliga players
Regionalliga players
Heracles Almelo players
TSG 1899 Hoffenheim players
FC St. Pauli players
FC Utrecht players
SpVgg Greuther Fürth players
Dutch expatriate footballers
Dutch expatriate sportspeople in Germany
Expatriate footballers in Germany